The Symington House, also known as the Symington–Continental House, is located at 2 Park Place in Newark, Essex County, New Jersey, United States. The house, built in 1808, is the last of the great mansions that were on the north side of Military Park. It was added to the National Register of Historic Places on March 2, 1979, for its significance in architecture. It was added as a contributing property to the Military Park Commons Historic District on June 18, 2004.

History and description
The house is a three story brick building with brownstone trim designed with Federal architecture style. The entrance features two fluted columns with Corinthian capitals. It was built in 1808 as a rectory for Trinity Church, which is located across the street. Reverend Matthew H. Henderson lived here until 1856. After the church sold the building, Robert B. Symington bought it in 1888. The Continental Insurance Company bought the building for office space in 1965. Trinity & St. Philip's Cathedral repurchased it in 1978 and renamed it St. Philip's House.

See also
National Register of Historic Places listings in Essex County, New Jersey

References

Buildings and structures in Newark, New Jersey
Houses on the National Register of Historic Places in New Jersey
Federal architecture in New Jersey
Houses completed in 1808
Houses in Essex County, New Jersey
National Register of Historic Places in Newark, New Jersey
New Jersey Register of Historic Places
1808 establishments in New Jersey
Historic district contributing properties in New Jersey
Historic district contributing properties in Newark, New Jersey
Individually listed contributing properties to historic districts on the National Register in New Jersey
Brick buildings and structures